Ike: Countdown to D-Day is a 2004 American made-for-television historical war drama film originally aired on the American television channel A&E, directed by Robert Harmon and written by Lionel Chetwynd. Countdown to D-Day was filmed entirely in New Zealand with the roles of British characters played by New Zealanders; the American roles were played by Americans.

Plot
Tom Selleck portrays General Dwight D. Eisenhower, US Army, popularly known by his nickname of "Ike." The film deals with the difficult decisions he made leading to up to D-Day, including dealing with the varied personalities of his command: Lieutenant General Omar N. Bradley, US Army (James Remar), Lieutenant General George S. Patton, US Army (Gerald McRaney), General Bernard Montgomery, British Army (Bruce Phillips) and General Charles de Gaulle, Free French (George Shevtsov).

The film does not have action sequences, focusing instead on the inner workings of Supreme Headquarters Allied Expeditionary Force that led to the successful D-Day invasion of World War II. Concentrating on decisions actually made by Eisenhower and the pressures brought to bear on him personally, it includes his personal relationship with British Prime Minister Winston Churchill (Ian Mune) and his own Chief of Staff, Lieutenant General Walter Bedell Smith, US Army (Timothy Bottoms).

The film is also notable for being the only major production in which General Montgomery's portrayal concentrates on his role as a competent military professional, instead of focusing on his alleged personality disorders, while still showing his eccentricities. General Patton's complex personality is also outlined in a very brief set of scenes played by Gerald McRaney.

The film omits Ike's relationship with Kay Summersby, his driver, though she appears briefly in a scene where the general officers are viewing movie reels. She is also portrayed as his driver when Ike visits US paratroopers on the eve of D-Day.

Cast
 Tom Selleck as Dwight D. Eisenhower
 James Remar as General Omar Bradley 
 Gerald McRaney as George S. Patton
 George Shevtsov as General Charles de Gaulle
 Timothy Bottoms as Walter Bedell "Beetle" Smith 
 Ian Mune as Prime Minister Winston Churchill
 Bruce Phillips as General Bernard Law Montgomery 
 Paul Gittins as Major General Henry Miller 
 John Bach as Air Marshal Sir Trafford Leigh-Mallory
 Nick Blake as Air Marshal Arthur W. Tedder 
 Kevin J. Wilson as Admiral Bertram Ramsay 
 Christopher James Baker as Group Captain James Stagg
 Bruce Hopkins as U.S. Colonel at Savoy 
 Gregor McLennan as Captain Chapman
 Paul Barrett as Major Wiatt 
 Mick Rose as King George VI
 Carole Seay as Queen Elizabeth The Queen Mother
 Brian Gidley as Chief Whip
 Mark Cirillo as Paul A. Hodgeson
 Catherine Boniface as Woman at Savoy  
 Rachel Wallis as WAC Sgt. 
 Stephen Brunton as Corporal Younger 
 David Mackie as Projector Sergeant
 Andrew Robertt as 101st Lt.
 Robert Pollock as 101st Sgt.
 Craig Hall as 101st Corporal  
 Clint Sharplin as 101st Paratrooper
 Millen Baird as 101st Private

Noteworthy

Errors
 Churchill incorrectly refers to the Combined Bomber Offensive as "saturation bombing", an anachronistic term that can only be accurately applied to RAF Bomber Command. The period term was "area bombing". 
 The opening scene suggests that Great Britain and the United States had not seriously considered the possibility of a supreme allied commander prior to planning the D-Day invasion. In fact, appointing supreme commanders for the various theaters was seen as a given as it had proved beneficial in the last days of World War I with the appointment of Ferdinand Foch in 1918 over the Allied forces in Western Europe. The reason Eisenhower's appointment took some negotiation was the fact that the original supreme commander for the European Theater of Operations, Frank Maxwell Andrews, was killed in an airplane crash.  
 The scene at the end of the film showing the visit to the 101st airborne troops is presented to the viewer as being on June 6, 1944. This particular gathering took place on the eve of D-Day on June 5, 1944, prior to the take-off to France. The airborne phase of Overlord began late in the evening of June 5 and into the early hours of June 6. Thus by daylight on June 6 Allied airborne troops were already on the ground in France.
 The film incorrectly talks about "DD" – "duplex drive" - landing craft.  No landing craft had DD drive.  The "DD's" actually were Sherman tanks modified with a waterproof underbody and displacement skirt, allowing the tank to float in calm water, and a propeller to propel the tank from LCT launching craft to shore.  On Omaha, most of them sank in rough seas, meaning the troops on the beach had no armored support. The raid by German torpedo boats on a large practice landing did happen, but did not involve DD (duplex drive craft) and was extensively "hushed up".
 Contrary to the film, LST's (landing ship tank) were not used on the initial hours of D-Day; they came in after the beaches were secured.
 General Montgomery's "dagger like thrust" into Berlin was not presented to Eisenhower before D-Day, it was part of his plan for operations following the breakout of Normandy and was presented during the first week of September. In fact the landings were enlarged from three beaches to five by Montgomery.
 In the film, Churchill said "no-one in Britain lives more than 150 miles from the sea". In fact, it is 65 miles.
 They are watching Olivier's Henry V which was released in London on 22 November 1944.

Historical accuracy
 In the opening scene which Prime Minister Winston Churchill and Eisenhower are discussing potential commanders for the top overall Normandy invasion command, Ike incorrectly refers to United States Army Air Forces General Carl Spaatz, nicknamed "Tooey", as 'Jimmy Spaatz'.
 The movie accurately depicts the incident in which Henry J. F. Miller, a temporary major general and West Point classmate of Eisenhower, who was serving as chief of the USAFE's Materiel Command, blurted out the general time and place of Overlord while drunk at a restaurant. A lieutenant of the 101st Airborne overheard this and reported it up the chain of command. Miller was sent back to the United States at his permanent rank of lieutenant colonel.
 The film accurately depicts the message Eisenhower composed for dissemination in the event of an unsuccessful invasion. In it, Eisenhower praised the troops who attempted the landings and took sole blame for the failure.
 The shortage of Higgins boats (LCVP) depicted in the film was real.
 The movie accurately references the role of the Canadian First Army (Juno Beach) instead of simply rolling it into a generic reference to the "British".

References

External links 
 
 
 

2004 television films
2004 films
American television films
Films shot in New Zealand
Films directed by Robert Harmon
A&E (TV network) original films
Cultural depictions of George VI
Cultural depictions of Dwight D. Eisenhower
Cultural depictions of Charles de Gaulle
Cultural depictions of Winston Churchill
Cultural depictions of George S. Patton
Cultural depictions of Bernard Montgomery
Operation Overlord films
World War II films based on actual events
American World War II films
2000s American films